Rasta Kido known as Rasta (良星) is a Japanese kickboxer. A professional competitor since 2013, Kido is the former BigBang Super Bantamweight titlist and one-time RISE Bantamweight title challenger. He is a highly considered Flyweight fighter by Combat Press.

Kickboxing career
Rasta was scheduled to face Masaki Takeuchi at RISE 130 on February 3, 2019. He won the fight by unanimous decision, with scores of 30-29, 30-28 and 30-29.

Rasta made his KNOCK OUT debut against Keisuke Miyamoto at KNOCK OUT 2019 SPRING: THE FUTURE IS IN THE RING on April 29, 2019, in a five-round fight. He won the closely-contested fight by unanimous decision, with scores of 50-49, 50-49 and 50-47.

Rasta was scheduled to face Tomo Arimatsu at RISE 133 on July 5, 2019. He won the fight by a first-round knockout, stopping Arimatsu with a right straight at the 2:05 minute mark of the round.

Rasta was scheduled to face Yuki Masato at RISE 134 on September 29, 2019. He won the fight by a third-round technical knockout.

His seven-fight winning streak earned Rasta the chance to challenge the reigning RISE Bantamweight champion Masahiko Suzuki at RISE 136 on January 13, 2020. The bout was a rematch of their July 6, 2018, meeting, which Rasta lost by unanimous decision. Rasta lost the fight by a late fourth-round knockout. It was the first stoppage loss of his kickboxing career.

Rasta was scheduled to fight Daiki Toita at RISE 141 on August 23, 2020. He won the fight by unanimous decision, with scores of 30-29, 30-28 and 30-28.

Rasta made his RIZIN debut against the four-time Rajadamnern Stadium title challenger Mutsuki Ebata at Rizin 24 - Saitama on September 27, 2020. He lost the fight by unanimous decision.

Rasta was scheduled to face Keito Naito at RISE 146 on February 23, 2021. He won the fight by unanimous decision.

Rasta was scheduled to face the former WBC Muaythai and WMC Japan titleholder David Chibana at RISE 151 on July 28, 2021. Rasta lost the fight by split decision, after an extra round was contested.

Rasta was scheduled to face the #4 ranked RISE bantamweight Takuya at RISE 152 on October 22, 2021. He won the fight by unanimous decision, with scores of 30-27, 30-27 and 30-26. He scored the sole knockdown of the fight in the second round, flooring Takuya with a high kick.

Rasta faced Ryunosuke Omori at RISE 157 on April 24, 2022. He lost the fight by knockout in the second round.

Titles and accomplishments
 2016 BigBang Super Bantamweight Champion (Defended 3 times)

Fight record

|-  style="background:#fbb;"
| 2022-04-24 ||Loss||align=left| Ryunosuke Omori|| RISE 157 || Tokyo, Japan|| KO (Punches)|| 2 || 2:38 
|-  style="text-align:center; background:#cfc;"
| 2021-10-22|| Win||align=left| Takuya || RISE 152 || Tokyo, Japan ||  Decision (Unanimous) || 3 ||3:00
|-  style="text-align:center; background:#fbb;"
| 2021-07-28|| Loss ||align=left| David Chibana || RISE 151 || Tokyo, Japan ||  Ext.R Decision (Split) || 4 ||3:00
|-  style="text-align:center; background:#cfc;"
| 2021-02-23|| Win ||align=left| Keito Naito || RISE 146 || Tokyo, Japan || Decision (Unanimous)  ||3  ||3:00
|-  style="text-align:center; background:#fbb;"
| 2020-09-27|| Loss ||align=left| Mutsuki Ebata || Rizin 24 - Saitama || Saitama, Japan || Decision (Unanimous) || 3 || 3:00
|-  style="text-align:center; background:#cfc;"
| 2020-08-23|| Win ||align=left| Daiki Toita || RISE 141 || Tokyo, Japan || Decision (Unanimous) || 3 || 3:00
|-  style="text-align:center; background:#fbb;"
| 2020-01-13||Loss ||align=left| Masahiko Suzuki || RISE 136 || Tokyo, Japan || KO (Straight Right) ||  4|| 2:49 
|-
! style=background:white colspan=9 |
|-  style="text-align:center; background:#CCFFCC;"
| 2019-09-29 ||Win ||align=left| Yuki Masato || RISE 134|| Tokyo, Japan || TKO (3 Knockdowns)|| 3 || 1:28
|-  style="text-align:center; background:#CCFFCC;"
| 2019-07-05|| Win ||align=left| Tomo Arimatsu || RISE 133 || Tokyo, Japan || KO (Straight Right)|| 1 || 2:05
|-  style="text-align:center; background:#CCFFCC;"
| 2019-04-29|| Win ||align=left| Keisuke Miyamoto || KNOCK OUT 2019 SPRING: THE FUTURE IS IN THE RING || Tokyo, Japan || Decision (Unanimous) || 5 || 3:00
|-  style="text-align:center; background:#CCFFCC;"
| 2019-02-03|| Win ||align=left| Masaki Takeuchi || RISE 130 || Tokyo, Japan || Decision (Unanimous) || 3 || 3:00
|-  style="text-align:center; background:#CCFFCC;"
| 2018-12-27|| Win ||align=left| Taku Ookubo || BigBang 34 || Tokyo, Japan || Decision (Unanimous) || 3 || 3:00
|-
! style=background:white colspan=9 |
|-  style="text-align:center; background:#CCFFCC;"
| 2019-02-03|| Win ||align=left| Jaehyuk Kang || RISE 128 || Tokyo, Japan || KO (High Kick & Punches)|| 2 ||
|-  style="text-align:center; background:#CCFFCC;"
| 2018-09-16|| Win ||align=left| Ryuji Horio || RISE 127 || Tokyo, Japan || Decision (Unanimous) || 3 || 3:00
|-  style="text-align:center; background:#FFBBBB;"
| 2018-07-06|| Loss ||align=left| Masahiko Suzuki || RISE 126 || Tokyo, Japan || Decision (Unanimous) || 3 || 3:00
|-  style="text-align:center; background:#CCFFCC;"
| 2018-06-03|| Win ||align=left| Yu Thong A||BigBang 33 || Tokyo, Japan || Decision (Unanimous) || 3 || 3:00
|-  style="text-align:center; background:#CCFFCC;"
| 2018-02-18|| Win ||align=left| Yuta Hayashi ||BigBang 32 || Tokyo, Japan || Decision (Unanimous) || 3 || 3:00
|-  style="text-align:center; background:#CCFFCC;"
| 2017-12-03|| Win ||align=left| Chikara Iwao ||BigBang 31 || Tokyo, Japan || Decision (Unanimous) || 3 || 3:00
|-
! style=background:white colspan=9 |
|-  style="text-align:center; background:#CCFFCC;"
| 2017-09-03|| Win ||align=left| Mochifumi Takahashi ||BigBang 30|| Tokyo, Japan || TKO (Ref. Stoppage/Punches) || 2 || 2:43
|-  style="text-align:center; background:#c5d2ea;"
| 2017-06-04|| Draw ||align=left| Chikara Iwao ||BigBang 29|| Tokyo, Japan || Decision (Majority) || 3 || 3:00
|-
! style=background:white colspan=9 |
|-  style="text-align:center; background:#CCFFCC;"
| 2017-04-02|| Win ||align=left| Takaaki || Krush.75 || Tokyo, Japan || Decision (Unanimous) || 3 || 3:00
|-  style="text-align:center; background:#FFBBBB;"
| 2017-01-15||Loss ||align=left| Namito Izawa || Krush.72 || Tokyo, Japan || Decision (Unanimous) || 3 || 3:00
|-  style="text-align:center; background:#CCFFCC;"
| 2016-09-04|| Win ||align=left| Takashi Ohno ||BigBang 26|| Tokyo, Japan || Decision (Unanimous) || 3 || 3:00
|-
! style=background:white colspan=9 |
|-  style="text-align:center; background:#CCFFCC;"
| 2016-06-05|| Win ||align=left| Ryo Pegasus ||BigBang 25|| Tokyo, Japan || Decision (Unanimous) || 3 || 3:00
|-  style="text-align:center; background:#CCFFCC;"
| 2016-02-21|| Win ||align=left| Yu Thong A||BigBang 24 || Tokyo, Japan || Decision (Unanimous) || 3 || 3:00
|-  style="text-align:center; background:#CCFFCC;"
| 2013-12-29|| Win||align=left| Yuki ||NJKF - Kizuna II || Tokyo, Japan || Decision (Unanimous) || 3 || 3:00
|-  style="text-align:center; background:#CCFFCC;"
| 2013-12-01|| Win||align=left| Shuto Hagiwara ||M-fight - The Battle of Muaythai III || Tokyo, Japan || Decision (Unanimous) || 3 || 3:00
|-  style="text-align:center; background:#CCFFCC;"
| 2013-10-14|| Win||align=left| Yuya Iwanami ||M-fight - Shuken 13 || Tokyo, Japan || Decision (Unanimous) || 3 || 3:00
|-  style="text-align:center; background:#FFBBBB;"
| 2013-09-08|| Loss||align=left| Takuya Saenchaigym ||M-fight - The Battle of Muaythai II|| Tokyo, Japan || Decision (Unanimous) || 3 || 3:00
|-  style="text-align:center; background:#FFBBBB;"
| 2013-06-29|| Loss||align=left| Toraji Otawara ||TRIBELATE vol.40 -Hybrid Club Fight-|| Tokyo, Japan || Decision (Majority)  || 3 || 3:00
|-  style="text-align:center; background:#CCFFCC;"
| 2013-04-13|| Win||align=left| Yuta ||NJKF - Kizuna I PIT Gym 20th Anniversary Show|| Tokyo, Japan || TKO  || 2 || 
|-
| colspan=9 | Legend:    

|-  style="background:#FFBBBB;"
| 2013-08-04|| Loss ||align=left| Daisuke Hara || J-GROW 43 || Tokyo, Japan || Decision ||  1|| 3:00
|-  style="background:#CCFFCC;"
| 2013-07-21|| Win||align=left| Ryusei Shimizu || REBELS.18 || Tokyo, Japan || KO ||  1||
|-  style="background:#CCFFCC;"
| 2013-06-09|| Win||align=left| Yuya Kosaka ||  TNK1 feat. REBELS || Tokyo, Japan || Decision (Unanimous)||  2|| 3:00
|-  style="background:#CCFFCC;"
| 2013-05-12|| Win||align=left| Michitake Shioi || BOM Kickboxing Amateur || Kanagawa Prefecture, Japan || ||  2|| 2:00
|-  style="background:#CCFFCC;"
| 2013-05-12|| Win||align=left| Yuya Inako || BOM Kickboxing Amateur || Kanagawa Prefecture, Japan || ||  2|| 2:00
|-  style="background:#cfc;"
| 2013|| Win||align=left| Hiroyuki Ishihara || TNT Amateur YZD Gym || Tokyo, Japan ||  Decision ||  ||
|-  style="background:#CCFFCC;"
| 2013-03-24|| Win||align=left| Ryo Watanabe || J-NETWORK || Tokyo, Japan || TKO || ||
|-  style="background:#CCFFCC;"
| 2012-10-28|| Win||align=left| Ruki Miwa ||REBELS MUAY-THAI 1 || Tokyo, Japan || Decision (Unanimous)|| 2|| 2:00
|-  style="background:#FFBBBB;"
| 2012-10-21|| Loss|| align="left" | Tenshin Nasukawa || Muay Lok 2012 3rd ||Tokyo, Japan|| Decision || 2 || 2:00
|-  style="background:#CCFFCC;"
| 2012-09-02|| Win||align=left| Yuki Egawa || BigBang Amateur Kickboxing || Tokyo, Japan || Decision || ||
|-  style="background:#CCFFCC;"
| 2012-07-01|| Win||align=left| Yuki Kurumizawa || Amateur REBELS BLOW-CUP 7|| Tokyo, Japan || Decision || 2 ||2:00
|-  style="background:#FFBBBB;"
| 2012-06-03|| Loss||align=left| Taiga Kawabe || BigBang Amateur 6|| Tokyo, Japan || Decision || 2 ||1:30
|-  style="background:#FFBBBB;"
| 2012-04-15|| Loss|| align=left| Kaito Ono || All Japan Jr. Kick Tournament, Semi Final || Osaka, Japan || Decision || 2 ||2:00
|-  style="background:#CCFFCC;"
| 2012-04-15|| Win|| align=left|  || All Japan Jr. Kick Tournament, Quarter Final || Osaka, Japan || ||  ||
|-  style="background:#CCFFCC;"
| 2012-03-04|| Win ||align=left| Yuki Egawa || All Japan Jr. Kick Kanto Area Selection Tournament, Final || Tokyo, Japan || Decision || ||
|-  style="background:#CCFFCC;"
| 2012-03-04|| Win ||align=left|  || All Japan Jr. Kick Kanto Area Selection Tournament, Semi Final || Tokyo, Japan || Decision || ||
|-  style="background:#CCFFCC;"
| 2012-03-04|| Win ||align=left|  || All Japan Jr. Kick Kanto Area Selection Tournament, Quarter Final || Tokyo, Japan || Decision || ||
|-  style="background:#FFBBBB;"
| 2011-12-18|| Loss ||align=left| Atsuki Senoo || KAMINARIMON || Tokyo, Japan || Decision || 2|| 1:30
|-
| colspan=9 | Legend:

See also
 List of male kickboxers

References

Living people
1997 births
Japanese male kickboxers
Sportspeople from Tokyo